Temsaman may refer to:
Temsaman (region), historical region in the Rif, northern Morocco
Temsamane a commune in the Driouch Province, Oriental administrative region, Morocco